was a Japanese manga artist and tarento born in Tosayamada (now part of Kami), Kōchi Prefecture, Japan. He was a long-time resident of Koishikawa, Bunkyō, Tokyo, Japan. He made his professional manga debut in 1963 with his story , published in Weekly Manga Times.

History
Hara was the oldest son, though he had an older sister. His father died of tuberculosis before he was born.

Hara died of liver cancer on 10 November 2006 at a hospital in Fujimi, Saitama Prefecture.

1943 births
2006 deaths
Manga artists
Deaths from liver cancer
People from Kōchi Prefecture